Huscher is a surname of German origin. Notable people with the surname include:

George Huscher (1865-1944), American politician
Robert Huscher (born 1938), American bobsledder

See also
Huscher, Kansas, an unincorporated community